Ledru may refer to:

People with the surname
Agis-Léon Ledru (1816-1885), French architect and politician.
Louis-Charles-François Ledru (1778-1861), French architect.
Louis-Antoine-Marie Ledru Gaultier de Biauzat (1845-1886), French architect.
Marie-Louise Ledru, French marathon runner.
Nicolas-Philippe Ledru (1731–1807), French magician.

People with the double-barrelled surname Ledru-Rollin
Alexandre Auguste Ledru-Rollin (1807-1874), French politician.

Locations
Ledru-Rollin, a subway station in Paris, France.